Tsikata is a surname. Notable people with the surname include:

Dzodzi Tsikata, Ghanaian feminist, academic and professor
Kojo Tsikata, captain in Ghanaian Provisional National Defence Council
Tsatsu Tsikata (born 1950), Ghanaian academic and lawyer
Yvonne Tsikata, Ghanaian economist